This list of the tallest buildings and structures in China ranks structures in China that stand at least  tall by height. The list includes buildings located in Macau but not those found in Hong Kong, which are featured in their own list.

Current

Under construction 
This table ranks structures under construction with planned height at least  by its planned height. It does not include structures that already reach their full height.

See also 
 List of tallest buildings in China

References

External links 
 http://skyscraperpage.com/diagrams/?31045853

China, People's Republic of